Hycemoor is a hamlet in Copeland borough of the county of Cumbria, in North west England. 


Location 
It is located on a minor road about a mile away from the village of Bootle and the A595 road. The nearest railway station is in the neighbouring hamlet of Bootle Station.

References 
Philip's Street Atlas (page 137)

External links 

 https://web.archive.org/web/20110710212811/http://eyezandearz.com/visit-Hycemoor-Cumbria-LA19.action

Hamlets in Cumbria
Bootle, Cumbria